Pajuna is a rare Spanish cattle breed, originating in Granada (Andalusia), which resembles the extinct aurochs, the wild ancestor of domestic cattle, in certain features.

Appearance and description  
 
Although the Pajuna has been constantly crossed with breeds such as the Retinta or the Murciana after 1950 and several lineages have lost their primitive characteristics (such as the wild type colour, long legs and athletic body shape) some lineages still bear considerable resemblance to the aurochs. The horns, especially of the bulls, face forwards and are light in colour with a dark tip. Bulls are dark brown to black with a light eel stripe; the cows are a much lighter reddish brown. In this aspect, Pajuna resembles the aurochs. It has been suggested that the breed originated in north Africa, and indeed some bulls have a saddle that looks very similar to depictions of north African aurochs.

Range and use 
This primitive cattle breed is given special protection in the official Spanish cattle breeds catalogue, because numbers have declined rapidly during the 1980s and 1990s. The quality of their meat is valued, but traditionally Pajuna were used as draft animals.

Like other robust cattle breeds, the Pajuna is adapted to harsh conditions, especially in cold mountainous regions. They require supplementary feeding only in extreme weather when grazing is not possible. Because of their hardiness, their aurochs-like body plan and their wild type colour, Pajuna is used by the Dutch organisation Stichting Taurus in the TaurOs Project, to fill the ecological niche once occupied by the aurochs. Together with breeds like Sayaguesa Cattle, Maremmana primitivo, Tudanca Cattle or Limia Cattle, the project aims to breed a type of cattle that resembles the aurochs.

See also 
 Aurochs

References

External links 
 Stichting Taurus 
 Regional Cattle Breeds on Pajuna

Cattle breeds originating in Spain
Cattle breeds